Phaneta is a genus of moths belonging to the subfamily Olethreutinae of the family Tortricidae.

Species
Phaneta alatana (McDunnough, 1938)
Phaneta albertana (McDunnough, 1925)
Phaneta altana (McDunnough, 1927)
Phaneta ambodaidaleia Miller, 1983
Phaneta amphorana (Walsingham, 1879)
Phaneta annetteana (Kearfott, 1907)
Phaneta apacheana (Walsingham, 1884)
Phaneta argenticostana (Walsingham, 1879)
Phaneta argutipunctana Blanchard & Knudson, 1983
Phaneta artemisiana (Walsingham, 1879)
Phaneta autochthones (Walsingham, 1897)
Phaneta autumnana (McDunnough, 1942)
Phaneta awemeana (Kearfott, 1907)
Phaneta benjamini (Heinrich, 1923)
Phaneta bimaculata (Kuznetzov, 1966)
Phaneta bucephaloides (Walsingham, 1891)
Phaneta camdenana (McDunnough, 1925)
Phaneta canusana Wright, in Wright, Brown & Gibson, 1997
Phaneta castrensis (McDunnough, 1929)
Phaneta cetratana (Kennel, 1901)
Phaneta cinereolineana (Heinrich, 1923)
Phaneta citricolorana (McDunnough, 1942)
Phaneta clarkei Blanchard & Knudson, 1983
Phaneta clavana (Fernald, 1882)
Phaneta columbiana (Walsingham, 1879)
Phaneta complicana (McDunnough, 1925)
Phaneta convergana (McDunnough, 1925)
Phaneta corculana (Zeller, 1874)
Phaneta crassana (McDunnough, 1938)
Phaneta cruentana Blanchard & Knudson, 1982
Phaneta decempunctana (Walsingham, 1879)
Phaneta delphinoides (Heinrich, 1923)
Phaneta delphinus (Heinrich, 1923)
Phaneta dorsiatomana (Kearfott, 1905)
Phaneta elongana (Walsingham, 1879)
Phaneta essexana (Kearfott, 1907)
Phaneta fasciculatana (McDunnough, 1938)
Phaneta ferruginana (Fernald, 1882)
Phaneta fertoriana (Heinrich, 1923)
Phaneta festivana (Heinrich, 1923)
Phaneta formosana (Clemens, 1860)
Phaneta granulatana (Kearfott, 1908)
Phaneta grindeliana (Busck, 1906)
Phaneta griseocapitana (Walsingham, 1879)
Phaneta implicata (Heinrich, 1931)
Phaneta indagatricana (Heinrich, 1923)
Phaneta indeterminana (McDunnough, 1925)
Phaneta infimbriana (Dyar, 1904)
Phaneta influana (Heinrich, 1923)
Phaneta insignata (Heinrich, 1924)
Phaneta kiscana (Kearfott, 1905)
Phaneta kokana (Kearfott, 1907)
Phaneta lapidana (Walsingham, 1879)
Phaneta latens (Heinrich, 1929)
Phaneta linitipunctana Blanchard & Knudson, 1983
Phaneta marmontana (Kearfott, 1907)
Phaneta mayelisana Blanchard, 1979
Phaneta migratana (Heinrich, 1923)
Phaneta minimana (Walsingham, 1879)
Phaneta misturana (Heinrich, 1923)
Phaneta modernana (McDunnough, 1925)
Phaneta modicellana (Heinrich, 1923)
Phaneta montanana (Walsingham, 1884)
Phaneta mormonensis (Heinrich, 1923)
Phaneta musetta Blanchard & Knudson, 1983
Phaneta nepotinana (Heinrich, 1923)
Phaneta ochrocephala (Walsingham, 1895)
Phaneta ochroterminana (Kearfott, 1907)
Phaneta octopunctana (Walsingham, 1895)
Phaneta offectalis (Hulst, 1886)
Phaneta olivaceana (Riley, 1881)
Phaneta oregonensis (Heinrich, 1923)
Phaneta ornatula (Heinrich, 1924)
Phaneta pallidarcis (Heinrich, 1923)
Phaneta pallidicostana (Walsingham, 1879)
Phaneta parmatana (Clemens, 1860)
Phaneta parvana (Walsingham, 1879)
Phaneta pastigiata (Heinrich, 1929)
Phaneta pauperana (Duponchel, in Godart, 1842)
Phaneta perangustana (Walsingham, 1879)
Phaneta pylonitis (Meyrick, 1932)
Phaneta radiatana (Walsingham, 1879)
Phaneta raracana (Kearfott, 1907)
Phaneta refusana (Walker, 1863)
Phaneta rupestrana (McDunnough, 1925)
Phaneta salmicolorana (Heinrich, 1923)
Phaneta sardoensis (Rebel, 1935)
Phaneta scalana (Walsingham, 1879)
Phaneta scotiana (McDunnough, 1958)
Phaneta segregata (Heinrich, 1924)
Phaneta setonana (McDunnough, 1927)
Phaneta southamptonensis (Heinrich, 1935)
Phaneta spectana (McDunnough, 1938)
Phaneta spiculana (Zeller, 1875)
Phaneta stramineana (Walsingham, 1879)
Phaneta striatana (Clemens, 1860)
Phaneta sublapidana (Walsingham, 1879)
Phaneta subminimana (Heinrich, 1923)
Phaneta tarandana (Moschler, 1874)
Phaneta tenuiana (Walsingham, 1879)
Phaneta tomonana (Kearfott, 1907)
Phaneta transversa (Walsingham, 1895)
Phaneta umbrastriana (Kearfott, 1907)
Phaneta umbraticana (Heinrich, 1923)
Phaneta verecundana Blanchard, 1980
Phaneta verna Miller, 1971
Phaneta vernalana (McDunnough, 1942)
Phaneta verniochreana (Heinrich, 1923)
Phaneta youngi (McDunnough, 1925)

See also
List of Tortricidae genera

References

External links
tortricidae.com

Eucosmini
Tortricidae genera